Bolivia competed at the 1976 Summer Olympics in Montreal, Quebec, Canada. Four competitors, all men, took part in five events in four sports.

Athletics

Men's Marathon
 Lucio Guachalla — 2:45:31 (→ 60th place)

Cycling

One cyclist represented Bolivia in 1976.

Individual road race
 Marco Soria — did not finish (→ no ranking)

1000m time trial
 Marco Soria — 1:14.480 (→ 26th place)

Equestrian

Roberto Nielsen-Reyes

Shooting

Jaime Sánchez

References

External links
Official Olympic Reports

Nations at the 1976 Summer Olympics
1976 Summer Olympics
Olympics